SKU is a common abbreviation for stock keeping unit.

SKU may also refer to:

Places
 Skiu-Kaya, two adjoining villages in Ladakh, India
 Skyros Island National Airport (IATA: SKU), Greece

Businesses and organizations
 SKU Amstetten, Austrian football club
 Sky Airline (ICAO: SKU), Santiago, Chile
 Sri Krishnadevaraya University, Andhra Pradesh, India
 SKU College of Engineering and Technology
 Church of Sweden Youth, the youth wing of the Church of Sweden
 Young Communist League of Sweden (disambiguation)
  (SkU), an air squadron of the Indonesian Air Force

See also
 Skus (disambiguation)